Paddy Lillis is a trade union leader from Northern Ireland.

Early life 
Worked as a heavy goods vehicle driver at Abbey Meat Packers in Newtownabbey in the early 1980s, when he joined the Union of Shop, Distributive and Allied Workers (USDAW).  In 1989, he became a full-time area organiser for the union, then in 1999 was appointed as its divisional officer for South Wales and Western England.

Elected deputy general secretary of Usdaw in 2004.  He served on the National Executive Committee of the Labour Party and was Chair of the Labour Party in 2015/2016.

Elected unopposed as general secretary of Usdaw in November 2017 and took up the position in July 2018

References

Year of birth missing (living people)
Living people
Chairs of the Labour Party (UK)
General Secretaries of the Union of Shop, Distributive and Allied Workers
British trade union leaders
People from Newtownabbey
Trade unionists from Northern Ireland